Wabigoon Lake Ojibway Nation, commonly known as Wabigoon First Nation (Anishinaabemowin: Waabigoniiw Saaga'iganiiw Anishinaabeg), is a Saulteaux First Nation band government who inhabit the Kenora District in northwestern Ontario, Canada.  It is approximately 19 km southeast of Dryden, Ontario. As of January 2008, the First Nation had a registered population of 533 people, of which their on-Reserve population was 175.

History

The Wabigoon Lake reserve was first laid out in 1884 and was confirmed by the Ontario government in 1915.  Members of the Wabigoon Band of Saulteaux living on the western portion of the Indian reserve moved away and formed the Eagle Lake First Nation.  Those living on the eastern portion of the Reserve officially changed its name to Wabigoon Lake Ojibway Nation on August 7, 1987.

Governance

The First Nation elect their officials through the Act Electoral System, consisting of a Chief and four councillors.  The current Chief is Clayton Wetelainen, the  four councillors are Laurel Spalding, Ron Williams, Tyson Williams, and forth coming via bi-election in January 2022.

As a signatory to Treaty 3, Wabigoon Lake Ojibway Nation is a member of the Bimose Tribal Council, a Regional Chiefs Council, and Grand Council of Treaty 3, a Tribal Political Organization that represents many of First Nation governments in northwesternern Ontario and southeastern Manitoba.

Reserve

The First Nation have reserved for themselves the  Wabigoon Lake 27 Indian reserve.

References

External links 
Wabigoon Lake Ojibway Nation, official website
AANDC profile
profile at Chiefs of Ontario 

First Nations governments in Ontario
Communities in Kenora District
Saulteaux reserves in Ontario
1915 establishments in Ontario